Thibault Rambaud (born 19 April 1997) is a French professional footballer who plays as a forward for Vannes OC.

Career statistics

Club

Notes

References

Living people
1997 births
French footballers
Association football forwards
Chamois Niortais F.C. players
Le Mans FC players
Vannes OC players
Championnat National 3 players
Championnat National 2 players